Bence Nádas (born 17 April 1996) is a Hungarian sprint canoeist.

He participated at the 2018 ICF Canoe Sprint World Championships.

References

1996 births
Hungarian male canoeists
Living people
ICF Canoe Sprint World Championships medalists in kayak
Canoeists from Budapest
European Games competitors for Hungary
Canoeists at the 2019 European Games
Canoeists at the 2020 Summer Olympics
Olympic canoeists of Hungary
21st-century Hungarian people